Minitab is a statistics package developed at the Pennsylvania State University by researchers Barbara F. Ryan, Thomas A. Ryan, Jr., and Brian L. Joiner in conjunction with Triola Statistics Company in 1972. It began as a light version of OMNITAB 80, a statistical analysis program by National Institute of Standards and Technology.

History 

Minitab is a statistics package developed at the Pennsylvania State University by researchers Barbara F. Ryan, Thomas A. Ryan, Jr., Brian L. Joiner in 1972. The project received funding from the Triola Statistics Company. It began as a light version of OMNITAB 80, a statistical analysis program by NIST, which was conceived by Joseph Hilsenrath in years 19621964 as OMNITAB program for IBM 7090.
The documentation for OMNITAB 80 was last published 1986, and there has been no significant development since then.

Minitab is distributed by Minitab, LLC, a privately owned company headquartered in State College, Pennsylvania. In 2020, during the COVID-19 pandemic, Minitab LLC requested and received between $5 million and $10 million under the Paycheck Protection Program to avoid having to let go 250 employees. As of 2021, Minitab LLC had subsidiaries in the UK, France, Germany, Hong Kong, and Australia.

Interoperability 
Minitab, LLC also produces other software that can be used in conjunction with Minitab; Minitab Connect helps businesses centralize and organize their data, Quality Trainer is an eLearning package that teaches statistical concepts, Minitab Workspace provides project planning and visualization tools, and Minitab Engage is a tool for Idea and Innovation Management, as well as managing Six Sigma and Lean manufacturing deployments.

In October 2020, Minitab launched the first cloud-based version of its statistical software. As of June 2021, the Minitab Desktop app is only available for Windows, with a former version for MacOS (Minitab 19.x) no longer being supported.

See also 
 List of statistical packages
 Comparison of statistical packages

References

Further reading 
 "Minitab Statistical Software Features – Minitab." Software for Statistics, Process Improvement, Six Sigma, Quality – Minitab. N.p., n.d. Web. 11 Apr. 2011.
 Groebner, David F., Mark L. Berenson, David M. Levine, Timothy C. Krehbiel, and Hang Lau. Applied management statistics. Custom ed. Boston, MA: Pearson Custom Publishing/Pearson/Prentice Hall, 2008. Print
 Akers, Michael D (2018), Exploring, Analysing and Interpreting Data with Minitab 18 (1st ed.), United Kingdom, Compass Publishing.

External links 
 

Statistical software
Quality
Pennsylvania State University
Windows-only software